Paul (P.J.) Rieckhoff is an American writer, social entrepreneur, activist and veteran of the United States Army and the Iraq War.  He is the president of Righteous Media Inc and the host of the Independent Americans podcast. Prior to that, he was the founder, CEO and executive director of Iraq and Afghanistan Veterans of America (IAVA), a non-partisan non-profit founded in 2004. He served as an Army first lieutenant and infantry rifle platoon leader in Iraq from 2003 through 2004. Rieckhoff was released from the Army National Guard in 2007. He is also the Karl Lowenstein Distinguished Visiting Lecturer in the Political Science Department at Amherst College, where he designed and taught a class on the 20th anniversary of 9/11, titled Understanding 9/11.

Education
Rieckhoff attended James I. O'Neill High School in Highland Falls, New York, and graduated from Amherst College in 1998 with a BA in political science. At Amherst, Rieckhoff was a varsity football and rugby player. He hosted a radio show on the college radio station, WAMH-FM and was president of the student government.

Military service
Rieckhoff enlisted in the U.S. Army Reserve on September 15, 1998, and completed Basic Combat Training and Advanced Individual Training at Fort McClellan, Alabama. He then served in the U.S. Army Reserve, as a specialist with the 812th Military Police Company.  While working on Wall Street in 1999, Rieckhoff transferred to the New York Army National Guard. He graduated from Officer Candidate School in June 2001 and was named a Distinguished Military Graduate. Rieckhoff selected infantry as his branch and joined A Company, 1-105th Infantry (Light).

Rieckhoff left Wall Street on September 7, 2001, with plans to travel and complete additional military schooling. On the morning of September 11, Rieckhoff was at his apartment in Manhattan when the first plane hit the World Trade Center. He participated in the rescue efforts at ground zero.

In 2002, Rieckhoff volunteered for the invasion of Iraq. In January of that year, he was on a plane to join the 3rd Infantry Division at Fort Stewart, Georgia. Rieckhoff was then assigned as a platoon leader in the [[124th Infantry Regiment|3-124th Infantry]of the Florida Army National Guard. The unit was attached to 1st Brigade, 3rd Infantry Division and spent almost a year conducting combat operations in Baghdad, Iraq. 

Rieckhoff was awarded a United States Army Commendation Medal for his service in Iraq.

Political activism
In 2008, Rieckhoff and IAVA supported the passage of the "Post-9/11 (New) GI Bill." February 7, 2007, he testified before the House Veterans Affairs Committee to advocate for passage of the bill.

On February 13, 2014, IAVA led the creation, passage and signing into law of the Clay Hunt Suicide Prevention for America's Veterans (SAV) Act. The law was named after Marine CPL Clay Hunt, a sniper, IAVA member and personal friend of Rieckhoff and other IAVA leaders. Rieckhoff participated in a signing ceremony at the White House.

Positions and critics

On veterans' issues
Rieckhoff has spoken in favor of veterans, including in conversation with former VA Secretary Eric Shinseki.

On Iraq War
Rieckhoff's book, Chasing Ghosts, is a criticism of the Iraq War and President George Bush.

On "Don't Ask Don't Tell"
He has been a vocal advocate for gay rights and the repeal of "Don't Ask Don't Tell" – and reform of the military's sexual assault policies.

On the film The Hurt Locker
Rieckhoff criticized the film, The Hurt Locker, posting a piece in Newsweek, titled "Veterans: Why 'The Hurt Locker' Isn't Reality" and appeared on PBS Newshour to state his position.

On the film American Sniper
Rieckhoff was a strong supporter of the controversial film, American Sniper, writing a review for Variety stating, "American Sniper is the single best work of film about the Iraq War ever made."

In 2015, Rieckhoff appeared on Comedy Central's The Nightly Show to defend American Sniper as an effective public awareness tool for veterans causes.

Iraq and Afghanistan Veterans of America
After returning home from Iraq in 2004, Rieckhoff founded Iraq and Afghanistan Veterans of America (IAVA), a nonpartisan organization for new veterans.

Public life
Rieckhoff has testified before Congress on issues facing the veterans' community and writes regularly for national websites and publications. In August 2011, Rieckhoff and four other IAVA members appeared on the cover of TIME magazine for a feature about Iraq and Afghanistan veterans being leaders of the New Greatest Generation.

He was profiled by The Hill in June 2014 in a piece titled, "From the battles of Iraq to those of DC".

Books
Rieckhoff wrote a book describing his experiences in Iraq and activism afterwards entitled Chasing Ghosts (2006). In 2006, Rieckhoff spoke to NPR's Fresh Air about the book.

Films
Rieckhoff has produced four documentary films (Warrior Champions, Reserved to Fight, Jerebek and When I Came Home) and acted in "The Green Zone" starring Matt Damon.

Awards, honors, and affiliations
Rieckhoff was inducted into the Global Ashoka Fellowship in 2010 as recognition of his innovation and entrepreneurship on behalf of new veterans.

A member of the Council on Foreign Relations, Rieckhoff is an advocate for Iraqi and Afghan refugees and interpreters, and an advisory board member of The List Project, "a non-profit operating in the U.S., founded with the belief that the United States Government has a clear and urgent moral obligation to resettle to safety Iraqis who are imperiled due to their affiliation with the United States of America." He helped bring his former Iraqi translator, Esam Pacha (who was targeted for assassination, to the US.

Named #37 of GQ's 50 Most Powerful People in D.C. in 2009.

Rolling Stone named Rieckhoff to its list of "The Quiet Ones: 12 Leaders Who Get Things Done" 

In 2013, Rieckhoff was named to The Verge: 50: "people that changed our lives" alongside leaders like Jeff Bezos, Elon Musk and Marissa Mayer.

Rieckhoff was awarded an honorary Doctor of Humane Letters by Amherst College in 2013.

In 2016, Rieckhoff was elected to the New York State Senate Veteran's Hall of Fame for distinguishing himself both in military and civilian life.

References

Press and published works
 Chasing Ghosts: Failures and Facades in Iraq: A Soldier's Perspective (NAL Caliber, 2007)
 "Celebrate Independence By Helping Our Veterans" in The Weekly Standard, 4 July 2011.
 "Paul Rieckhoff and Nick Colgin on vet unemployment" on CNN, 5 August 2011.
 "Cost of Treating Veterans Will Rise Long Past Wars" in The New York Times, 27 July 2011.
 "Who Are You Calling Rambo?" in Newsweek, 12 June 2009.
 "Do Unto Your Enemy..." in The New York Times, 25 September 2006.
 "Paul Rieckhoff on SupportOurTroops.org" on The Colbert Report, 5 May 2009.
 "When Cinéma Vérité Isn't" in Newsweek, 23 February 2010.

External links

1970s births
Living people
United States Army personnel of the Iraq War
American non-fiction writers
Amherst College alumni
Military personnel from New York City
United States Army officers
Place of birth missing (living people)
Activists from New York City
United States Army reservists
New York National Guard personnel
Ashoka Fellows
Ashoka USA Fellows